Black River Bridge may refer to:

Black River Bridge, New Brunswick
Black River Bridge (Carrizo, Arizona), listed on the National Register of Historic Places in Gila County, Arizona
Black River Bridge (Pocahontas, Arkansas), listed on the National Register of Historic Places in Randolph County, Arkansas